Albertson v. Subversive Activities Control Board, 382 U.S. 70 (1965), was a case in which the Supreme Court of the United States ruled on November 15, 1965, that persons (in this case, William Albertson) believed to be members of the Communist Party of the United States of America could not be required to register as party members with the Subversive Activities Control Board because the information which party members were required to submit could form the basis of their prosecution for being party members, which is a crime, and therefore deprived them of their self-incrimination rights under the Fifth Amendment to the United States Constitution.

See also 
 Communist Party v. Subversive Activities Control Board,  and 
 United States v. Sullivan, 
 William Albertson

External links 

United States Fifth Amendment self-incrimination case law
United States Supreme Court cases
United States Supreme Court cases of the Warren Court
1965 in United States case law
Communist Party USA litigation